Chiromo is a town in southern Malawi by the Shire River.

The Nairobi suburb of Chiromo near Westlands, as well as University of Nairobi Chiromo Campus and Nairobi's Chiromo Road got their name from this town. Ewart Grogan saw the two rivers that met in that Nairobi area reminding him of the village in southern Malawi and named the place Chiromo. Chiromo means “joining of the streams”.

Transport 

It is served by a Station on the national railway system, the railway line extends to Blantyre.

It was for many years the heart of the cotton industry and had one of the best bridges in Africa at the time. The bridge suffered a severe washaway in the late 1990s.

See also 

 Railway stations in Malawi

References 

Populated places in Southern Region, Malawi